Love & Love Only  is a 2015 English-language Australian film directed by Indian-born Australian filmmaker Julian Karikalan. starring Rohit Kalia, who was Mr. India Australia in 2014 and Georgia Nicholas in lead roles.

A cross-cultural romantic film where an Indian falls in love with an Australian girl features background score and songs by India's legendary composer Ilaiyaraaja. This is the first-ever English-language feature film for which he has composed original songs.

The film was launched for online audience on 22 November 2016 and is available on YouTube in countries that allow Paid content, while for the rest of the world, the movie is available on Vimeo on demand and VHX.

Summary

Krishna is forcefully sent to Australia by his parents to learn business and life, but he struggles to adapt to Australian ways as he was always pampered by his mom. In Australia, he falls in love with Stacey, his co-worker, a school dropout from a broken family. Krishna's struggle with cultural differences create problems in their relationship.

Cast
 
Rohit Kalia
Georgia Nicholas
Shekhar Mehta
Ambika Asthana
Anton Manojkumar
Murthy Vaitheeswaran
Robert Osborne
Ben Cork
Sashi Dandekar
Suparna Mallick
Laurence Nath
Juveena Julian
Juvinitha Julian
Vikas Sehgal

Production

Development

By mid-2010, Julian decided to write a screenplay for a self-funded feature film that could be made on an ultra-low budget, cost effective production methodology that he was proposing theoretically. He wanted to practically test out his model. From characters to locations, everything was conceived with this model in mind and it took various drafts to fine tune the script. Finally the shooting commenced in November 2013.

Casting
The casting call for actors was advertised online in a casting website called Starnow. The male lead role was initially offered to an interstate actor of Australia, however, due to several delays in filming and constraints in budget, the role was offered to Rohit Kalia who was supposed to do another role in the film. He is a student of Anupam Kher’ s acting school, and is an IT professional during the week. 
Though there was an overwhelming response for the female lead role, Julian wasn't keen in casting anyone of them and his search led him to an extra named Georgia Nicholas.

He auditioned her and did a test filming. He was mocked at by many industry professionals and friends for his choice of an extra, based on her initial performance in the trial shoot. Julian took this as a challenge and personally trained Georgia for the role of Stacey over a period of three months, and was happy about her performance in the end. 
Meantime, due to the limited shooting time, extensive rehearsals were held over the weekends for a period of two months, with all the key actors, this ensured that they were very familiar with the characters and the lines.

Filming

Official filming commenced on 14 November 2013. As everyone in the cast and crew including Julian had day jobs during the week, the film shooting was done only on weekends and the shooting was completed on a total of 30 shoot days over a period of 6 months. One of the major locations for filming was an Indian spice shop named Udaya spices where the main characters work. This was Julian's first workplace in Australia when he was a student in the University of Technology Sydney (UTS), back in 2003.

Music

Contrary to regular industry practice, the composer of the film came aboard only after the whole film was edited and ready for a preliminary viewing. Being a huge fan of Ilaiyaraaja, Julian couldn't think of anyone else for the music, but being his first feature film that was made on an innovative methodology, he himself wasn't sure about the outcome. So, he wanted to complete the film in the first place. Once he saw the finished product, he was confident enough to approach the legendary composer and made a trip to India to meet Ilaiyaraaja through his musical co-ordinator Subbiah. The meeting was successful and Ilaiyaraaja happily consented to support the project, despite its budgetary constraints. The entire background score was completed within 6 days including recording and technical post-production. Apart from BGM, there are two songs as well in the film. Being an English film, the composer was keen in getting native western voices. After advertising online in Australia, Rachael Leahcar, the South Australian singer was chosen to render her voice for the first ever song composed by Ilaiyaraaja for an English film. The background tracks were recorded in Prasad Studios, Chennai and the voice was recorded and mixed in Australia.

References

External links

2015 films
Australian romantic comedy-drama films
Films scored by Ilaiyaraaja
Films set in Australia
Films shot in Australia
2015 directorial debut films
2010s English-language films